He's A Smoothie (foaled 1963 in Ontario) was a Canadian Thoroughbred Champion and Hall of Fame racehorse who set track records on both dirt and  turf. Bred and raced by William R. Beasley, his sire was the U.S. Racing Hall of Fame inductee Round Table. His dam was Ratine, a daughter of Bahram, the Aga Khan's 1935 British Triple Crown champion. A successful sire of two British Classic winners, Bahram was purchased in 1940 by an American syndicate led by Alfred G. Vanderbilt II, who brought him to stand at stud in Maryland.

1966
He's a Smoothie was trained by the owner's son, Warren Beasley, who said, "I was listed as the trainer but Bobby (Bateman) was really the trainer."  Slow to develop, the colt did not race at age two. At age three, he earned his first win in May 1966 on the dirt at the Fort Erie Racetrack in Fort Erie, Ontario. He went on to win the Mohawk Handicap, the Fairbanks Handicap, the first of two straight Seagram Cup Handicaps, the  Valedictory Handicap at 1 miles, and a Canadian Classic, the  Prince of Wales Stakes.

1967 Horse of the Year
In 1967, He's a Smoothie raced in both Canada and the United States. His major victories came in the Canadian Maturity Stakes, the Durham Cup Handicap, the Eclipse Stakes, his second straight Seagram Cup Handicap, and the most prestigious win of his career, the Canadian International Championship.

Based on his performances in Canada, He's a Smoothie was invited to compete against some of the best American and European horses in the November 12, 1967 Washington, D.C. International Stakes at Laurel Park Racecourse in Maryland. He's a Smoothie ran fourth after he was given seven more pounds to carry that the great Damascus and race winner Fort Marcy.  On December 9, He's A Smoothie was sent to Aqueduct Racetrack to compete in the Display Handicap. Once again he was high-weighted, given a handicap of nine pounds more than winner Quicken Tree. Nonetheless, he still came from far back in the two-mile race to finish second, just three-quarters of a length behind the winner.

He's a Smoothie was voted 1967 Canadian Horse of the Year honors.

1968
Wintered in Florida, at Gulfstream Park He's a Smoothie ran second in a division of the January 24, 1968 Palm Beach Handicap, then earned a third in the February 11 Bougainvillea Handicap at Hialeah Park Race Track. In the longest and richest of the grass races on the local 1968 race schedule, on February 24 He's a Smoothie was ridden by Braulio Baeza to victory in the 1½ mile Hialeah Turf Cup Handicap. The holder of a Woodbine Racetrack and a Greenwood Raceway track record on dirt, among his other 1968 wins in Canada He's a Smoothie set a new course record for 1 miles on turf at the Fort Erie Racetrack.

Sale and Death
On July 24, 1968, He's a Smoothie was sold to a California syndicate led by William E. Pasko III, who planned to retire the horse at the end of the year to stand at  stud.  He's a Smoothie was competing in the August 7 Bernard Baruch Handicap at Saratoga Race Course when he broke down as a result of torn ligaments and had to be humanely euthanized. 

In 2003, He's a Smoothie's racing career was honored with induction in the Canadian Horse Racing Hall of Fame.

Pedigree

References
 He's A Smoothie's pedigree and partial racing stats
 October 25, 1967 New York Times article titled "He's A Smoothie Invited To Laurel International"
 He's A Smoothie at the Canadian Horse Racing Hall of Fame

1963 racehorse births
1968 racehorse deaths
Horses who died from racing injuries
Racehorses bred in Ontario
Horse racing track record setters
Racehorses trained in Canada
Racehorses trained in the United States
Canadian Thoroughbred Horse of the Year
Canadian Horse Racing Hall of Fame inductees
Thoroughbred family 17-b